Melanella mamilla is a species of sea snail, a marine gastropod mollusk in the family Eulimidae.

Distribution
This marine species is endemic to Australia and occurs off Tasmania.

References

 May, W.L. 1915 [1916]. Additions to the Tasmanian Mollusca, with descriptions of new species. Papers and Proceedings of the Royal Society of Tasmania 1915: 75-99 [issued separately 31 December 1915]

External links
 To World Register of Marine Species

mamilla
Gastropods described in 1916
Gastropods of Australia